Luckley House School (formerly Luckley-Oakfield School) is an independent day and boarding school, located in Berkshire in England. It has a community of about 300 pupils, with about 250 in the first five-year groups, and 50 in the Sixth Form. The school is set in a rural location, south of the historic market town of Wokingham. The school has historically been an all girls' school, but became coeducational from September 2015.

History
Luckley School, founded in 1918, has always occupied its present site. The main house, which dates from 1907, replaced Luckley Manor, an ancient property mentioned in the Domesday Book of 1086.  Oakfield School was established in the Lake District in 1895. The two schools were amalgamated on the Wokingham site in 1959 as an independent educational trust regulated by the Charity Commissioners. In September 2015 Luckley House became co-educational.

House system
There are four houses at Luckley: Cornish (red), Blake (blue), Galloway (green), Randal (yellow).
There are house events throughout the year, which include the annual Christmas Cracker Drama event, Sports Day, Junior and Senior Rounders, Tennis, Netball, Badminton, Hockey, The Mary Evans quiz, and the House Music Competition.  Each event contributes points towards the end of year House Cup and the winners go on a House outing at the end of the summer term. 
On an ongoing basis the four houses are expected to devise community service events or fundraisers to include as many house members as possible. The project has to be co-ordinated and promoted by the pupils. House Captains and deputies are also responsible for liaising with staff about transport and guidance, as well as building links with staff at the places that they are supporting. But now they have changed the houses. They are now Blake, Randle, Cornish and Galloway, named after previous head masters/mistresses.

The Whitty Theatre
The school has its own professional working theatre, The Whitty Theatre, which is also available for outside hire.

Notable former pupils

Sarah Beeny – property developer, television presenter

References

External links
School Website
Theatre Website
Profile on the ISC website

Editor's mark

Educational institutions established in 1918
Private schools in the Borough of Wokingham
Boarding schools in Berkshire
1918 establishments in England
Church of England private schools in the Diocese of Oxford